Antonio Guzmán Núñez (born 2 December 1953) is a Spanish former footballer who played as a midfielder.

He played 91 games in La Liga, scoring a combined five goals for Rayo Vallecano, Atlético Madrid and Almería.

Guzmán appeared for the Spain national team at the 1978 World Cup.

Club career
Born in Torrejón de Ardoz, Community of Madrid, Guzmán's professional career was mostly associated with local clubs Rayo Vallecano and Atlético Madrid. He helped the former promote to La Liga in 1977, and contributed with 27 games and one goal to the latter's third-place finish at the end of the 1978–79 season.

After several years of inactivity, 33-year-old Guzmán returned to active and joined Segunda División B team RSD Alcalá, also in his native region. Previously, in 1980–81, he appeared with AD Almería in their second-ever campaign in the top flight, equalling a career-best four goals but being relegated.

International career
Guzmán earned two caps for Spain in 1978, and was part of the squad at that year's FIFA World Cup, where he featured in the 0–0 group stage draw against Brazil. His debut occurred on 24 May, in a friendly in Uruguay held before the tournament (same result).

References

External links

1953 births
Living people
People from Torrejón de Ardoz
Spanish footballers
Footballers from the Community of Madrid
Association football midfielders
La Liga players
Segunda División players
Segunda División B players
Tercera División players
Rayo Vallecano players
Atlético Madrid footballers
RSD Alcalá players
Spain international footballers
1978 FIFA World Cup players